Armana is a genus of moths of the family Noctuidae. Its only species, Armana nigraericta, is found in Myanmar. Both the genus and the species were first described by Swinhoe in 1890.

References

Catocalinae
Monotypic moth genera